Eobard Thawne, otherwise known as the Reverse-Flash and Professor Zoom, is a supervillain appearing in American comic books published by DC Comics. The character was created by John Broome and Carmine Infantino, and first appeared in The Flash #139 in September 1963. The first and most well-known character to assume the Reverse-Flash mantle, Thawne is depicted as the archenemy of Barry Allen (the second character to be called the Flash), a descendant of Malcolm Thawne, and a forefather of Bart Allen, Thaddeus Thawne, and Owen Mercer. He has also been established as one of the fastest speedsters in the DC Universe.

Hailing from the 25th century, Thawne was a scientist who became obsessed with and idolized Barry Allen and managed to replicate the accident that gave him his powers. However, he was driven insane upon learning he was destined to become the Flash's greatest enemy; fueled by jealousy and hatred, he became determined to ruin Barry's (the Flash) life as the "Reverse Flash." Thawne's powers come from the "Negative Speed Force" which he uses to alter time to his own whims. 

The character has been adapted in various media incarnations, and been portrayed in live-action by Tom Cavanagh and Matt Letscher in the Arrowverse television series The Flash, Legends of Tomorrow, Supergirl, and Arrow.

Fictional character biography

Eobard Thawne found a time capsule in the 25th century containing a costume of the Flash (Barry Allen) and with a Tachyon device amplified the suit's speed energy, giving himself speedster abilities. Reversing the costume's colors, he adopted the moniker of "Professor Zoom the Reverse-Flash" and went on a crime spree. However, the time capsule also contained an atomic clock which, due to the effects of time travel, altered into an atomic bomb. To prevent its detonation, Flash pursued and defeated Zoom, hoping he knew where the clock was. He did not, but Flash later found the clock, detonated it safely, and destroyed Thawne's costume.

Blaming the Flash for his defeat, Thawne became obsessed with "replacing" Barry and traveled back in time to exact his revenge. When Iris West (Barry's wife) rejected his romantic pursuits, Thawne killed Iris. After Flash had found love again, Thawne threatened to kill Fiona Webb (Barry's new fiancé) on their wedding day. Fearful that history was repeating itself, Barry killed Thawne by breaking his neck.

Post-Crisis and Zero Hour origin
The Post-Crisis extended origin storyline "The Return of Barry Allen" revealed that Thawne, prior to discovering  the time capsule contains the Flash's costume, was once a scientist obsessed with him, even undergoing cosmetic surgery to resemble his hero. Obtaining the Cosmic Treadmill from an antique shop, Thawne gained all of the Flash's powers after replicating the electrochemical accident that created the Flash. Seeking to use the Cosmic Treadmill to travel back in time and meet his idol, Thawne arrived at the Flash Museum several years after Barry's death, discovering that he was destined to become Professor Zoom the Reverse-Flash and die at his idol's hands. As a result, the unstable Thawne convinced himself that he was Barry (based on his intimate knowledge of Barry's life from his reading of the Flash's as-yet-unpublished biography) and subsequently attacked Central City for "forgetting him". Wally West ultimately tricked Thawne into returning to the 25th century with no memory of the incident. Despite this, Thawne still managed to bring the remains of his older self's costume with him, cluing him further into his destiny.

After the events of Zero Hour: Crisis in Time!, it is revealed that Malcolm Thawne is Eobard Thawne's ancestor and Barry's long-lost twin brother, meaning that Barry is Thawne's great-uncle.

The Flash: Rebirth

In 2009, Thawne was re-imagined as a major villain in the DC Universe by writer Geoff Johns in The Flash: Rebirth. His resurrection is foreshadowed to occur in a near-future event. It is later revealed that Thawne's recreation of the accident behind Barry's powers made Thawne able to lure Barry out of the Speed Force during Final Crisis and temporarily turn his nemesis into the Black Flash.

When Thawne reappears, he murders the revived Johnny Quick, before proceeding to trap Barry and the revived Max Mercury inside the negative Speed Force. Thawne then attempts to kill Wally's children through their Speed Force connection in front of Linda Park-West, only to be stopped by Jay Garrick and Bart Allen. Thawne defeats Jay and prepares to kill Bart, but Barry, Max, Wally, Jesse Quick and Impulse arrive to prevent the villain from doing so. In the ensuing fight, Thawne reveals that he is responsible for every tragedy that has occurred in Barry's life, including the death of Nora Allen (Barry's mother). Thawne then decides to destroy everything the Flash holds dear by killing Iris before they even met.

As Barry chases after Thawne, Wally joins Barry in the time barrier. They reach Thawne and in doing so, they become the lightning bolt that turns Barry into the Flash as they are able to stop Thawne from killing Iris. The Flashes push Thawne back through time, showing his past and future. They return to the present, where the Justice League, the Justice Society, and the Outsiders have built a device originally intended to disconnect Barry from the Speed Force as the Black Flash. Barry tosses Thawne in and Jay activates the device, severing his connection to the negative Speed Force. As the Flashes tie him up to stop him from running, Iris discovers Thawne's weapon back in the past, which she keeps.

In the present, he is imprisoned in Iron Heights. Hunter Zolomon speaks to him, saying they can help each other be better. In Gorilla City, one of the apes warns that Professor Zoom has done something horrible to their jungles, but just what he has done is something even they do not know.

Blackest Night
In the 2009–2010 storyline "Blackest Night", the Pre-Crisis version of Thawne's broken-necked corpse is reanimated as a member of the Black Lantern Corps. The black power ring downloaded the corpse's memories, resulting in him not knowing of Barry's death and resurrection. Declaring himself the new "Black Flash", he hunts down and attacks Barry, who manages to elude him for the moment. When the Black Lantern Rogues attack Iron Heights, the living Thawne is encountered and the Black Lanterns' rings strangely malfunction, displaying a strange symbol. When Thawne's corpse approaches his living counterpart, he stops moving and is then frozen by Captain Cold's "cold grenade". Thawne's corpse is brought back to life by the white light of creation, and manages to escape.

In the follow-up "Brightest Day" storyline, the present Professor Zoom is still imprisoned in Iron Heights. When Deadman activates the White Power Battery, the Entity speaks to the 12 heroes and villains resurrected at the climax of the "Blackest Night" and tells each of them of their mission that must be accomplished to restore 'life' to the universe and prevent the Blackest Night from ever reoccurring. Zoom becomes the first to inadvertently fulfill his mission, which occurred in the events of The Flash: Rebirth when he freed Allen from the Speed Force following the resurrection. The Entity proclaims Zoom has completed his task and his life is restored to him, later revealing that Zoom (having fulfilled his task) is now fully purged of all trace remnants of his Black Lantern ties – both present and future. Zoom is released from Iron Heights by Captain Boomerang, who had hoped to better understand his version of the Entity's message. Zoom does not answer him directly, giving a cryptic response and eventually escaping as Captain Boomerang is confronted by the rest of the Rogues.

Post-Infinite Crisis origin
Thawne uses his powers to completely rewrite his own history; he erases his younger brother from existence and kills his parents when they try to interfere with his research. Thawne later falls in love with a reporter who had been hired to interview him, thus his future self wipes all of the reporter's romantic interests from existence. After finding out his would-be love interest did not return his affections, Thawne's future self traumatized the reporter as a child, causing the woman to be mute and institutionalized so that they never met each other. He later had his younger self find the time capsule containing Barry's costume to make himself the Flash of the 25th century. He sheds a tear as his altered past self runs past him while saying "It won't last long. You will never find love. You will never be the Flash. Barry Allen destroyed my future. It's time I destroyed his.".

Flashpoint
In the 2011 Flashpoint storyline, a new timeline is created through the alteration of history. The Reverse-Flash reveals that his body is permanently connected to the Speed Force, enabling him to create a negative version, with which he escaped prison. He was unable to alter Barry's transformation into the Flash, however, as that would effectively erase himself from existence. Instead, Thawne decides to ruin Barry's life during the latter's childhood, killing his mother, Nora. Thawne later reveals that the Flashpoint timeline was created when Barry went back in time to stop the Reverse-Flash from killing Nora. After Thawne is killed by this reality's Batman with a sword stab through the chest, the Flash travels back in time to stop Barry's younger self from altering history but instead, under Pandora's manipulations, a third, new timeline is created, in which DC Comics' continuity takes place from 2011 onward.

The New 52
In The New 52 reboot of DC's continuity, Thawne's origin is re-established as hailing from the Central City of a 25th-century devoted to the Flash. As a child, Thawne witnessed his father murder his mother and subsequently get arrested. One day, he is struck by lightning and gains the ability to control the flow of time around him, making it appear as if he is moving at superhuman speeds. Believing himself to have been "chosen" by the Speed Force as the Flash's replacement, Thawne dons a costume similar to the hero's and begins to terrorize the Gem Cities as "Zoom", demanding the citizens accept him as a king. However, he is enraged when people rebel against him in the Flash's name. Jealous and bitter that the Flash is worshiped and loved by the people despite their similar powers, Thawne uses Rip Hunter's notes to travel back in time, where he starts recruiting four individuals "touched by the lightning" (the Speed Force) across history, after "saving" them from situations he himself put them into under the false pretense that he requires their help to vanquish the "evil menace" of the Flash.

Thawne then makes an acquaintance with Henry Allen (Barry's father), funding Henry's research lab. But when Henry refuses to help him with an unknown cause, Zoom subsequently murders Nora to make Barry endure and give them both an "equal start", and forces Henry to take the blame for his deed, with the threat of Barry's life. Laying low for many years, Zoom reemerges following William Selkirk's defeat, recruiting as an "acolyte" of his. Zoom and his acolytes then cause havoc in the city and put the blame on the Flash, desiring to destroy his nemesis's legacy. Thawne then kidnaps Henry when some inmates escape from prison to divert Thawne's attention away from Barry, and forces Henry to construct a power-stealing glove. But when his closest "ally" Magali (who has been keeping Thawne alive for centuries via powers) discover the truth about him, he uses the glove to steal Magali's abilities of affecting the age of organic and inorganic matter, leading to his true nature being exposed to the rest of his acolytes, who join forces with the Flash to destroy the device.

After the failure of his plan to be a god, Zoom then takes Henry to the Allen house, with Barry in pursuit. Revealing his backstory to Barry, Thawne proceeds to best Barry in combat and is about to kill him until the Flash realizes how Thawne's powers work, and then proceeds to counter by moving time forward – finally defeating him. After talking Henry out of killing Thawne, Barry has him arrested and imprisoned at Iron Heights Penitentiary.

The serial-killing speedster Godspeed later attempts to kill Thawne and every other inmate at Iron Heights as a twisted gesture of friendship to Barry, only to be stopped by the hero.

DC Rebirth origin
In the DC Rebirth relaunch, Thawne's powers are retconned back to Negative Speed Force superspeed, his origin is revised to be closer to his pre-Flashpoint ones (albeit with some differences and an altered motive), and the Reverse-Flash mantle is returned to him, now as his primary moniker. In spite of these retcons, his New 52 history is shown to have somehow still occurred, to some extent.

An only child when his parents died in an accident, Eobard Thawne grew up obsessed with the Flash. After finding a time capsule with the speedster's costume, he uses traces of the Speed Force in it to turn himself into a Flash. Due to a lack of threats in the 25th century, Thawne creates his own by endangering people, before "saving" them. He is overjoyed when Barry Allen travels to his time and teaches him new tricks, but his deceit is soon found out. After Barry defeats him and has him arrested, Thawne promises to rehabilitate himself, to that end undergoing therapy and becoming a professor. He also eventually becomes the curator of the Flash Museum. Seeking to show Barry how much he's changed and become his partner, Thawne travels to the past. However, he is enraged after he witnesses Barry give Wally West a talk on how "every second is a gift", similar to one that Barry gave him, and realises that he wasn't treated specially by the Flash. Still seeking to spend time with the Flash and be his friend, Thawne becomes the Reverse-Flash, vowing to making Barry's life a living hell until he learns to "make time" for him.

The Button and aftermath

Leading up to the 2017 The Button crossover, Thawne's memories of his Pre-New 52 self are restored after a mysterious wave of energy strikes him, and he recalls being killed by Batman (Thomas Wayne) during Flashpoint. Seeking to teach the Dark Knight's son a lesson, Thawne attacks Bruce Wayne in the Batcave and destroys Thomas's letter as retribution. Thawne brutally beats and verbally taunts Bruce before picking up the Comedian's smiley-face pin, which teleports him away to an unknown location. Thawne is then teleported back to the Batcave, having been bathed in radiation by a mysterious entity. As he collapses, Thawne says "God...I saw...God." After discovering traces of his energy signature on Thawne's corpse, Barry ponders if he kills the Reverse-Flash at some point in his future (but Thawne's past). Batman and the Flash come across Thawne in possession of the Button shortly before his apparent death, and follow him in an attempt to prevent it. As he follows the traces leading to the entity, Thawne muses that he may go back in time to raise his nemesis as a "family friend" after killing Nora, but is killed by Doctor Manhattan and teleported back to the Batcave.

In the aftermath of "The Button", Thawne's corpse is taken to S.T.A.R. Labs, but he is resurrected via his connection to the Negative Speed Force and returns to the future, to examine the difference between the pre and post-Flashpoint timelines. He is present at Iris West's house when she arrives with Wallace West, who Thawne brutally beats and denounces as a fake, before kidnapping Iris and bringing her to the 25th century. When Barry arrives, he is quickly beaten by Thawne, who reveals his identity as the Flash to Iris. Thawne subsequently shows the couple's future and tricks Barry into becoming trapped in the Negative Speed Force, but Flash becomes connected to it and escapes. A pleased Thawne implores Barry to "ditch the loser sidekicks" and become his friend and partner, but Flash refuses and strips him of his speed. Nevertheless, Thawne vows to regain his powers and keep coming back to torment Barry, before being killed by Iris with a vaporisation gun.

It is later revealed that Thawne pulled Thomas Wayne out of the Flashpoint timeline just as Manhattan erased it, to torment Thomas with the main timeline, where Bruce is Batman.

Erasure
Thawne is revealed to be the only person to have defeated the chronokinesis-wielding new Flash villain, Paradox. To learn how to do so, Barry pulls an earlier version of Thawne out of the timeline, from the night he killed Nora.

Thawne later starts to assemble the Legion of Zoom by bringing together Captain Cold, Golden Glider, Gorilla Grodd, Tar Pit, the Tornado Twins, Trickster, and Turtle. They start to attack Flash on all fronts to the point where Thawne starts to take over Flash's body enough that the Flash Family had to assemble to combat him. After Thawne in Barry's body tries to get Captain Cold, Golden Girder, Gorilla Grodd, and Turtle to dig up Nora Allen's body, Trickster and the Tornado Twins try to stop him when the rest of the Flash family shows up only to be returned to their own timelines. When Thawne is exorcised from Barry Allen, he rounds up every villain who hates the Flash family to expand his Legion of Zoom like Abra Kadabra, Belladonna, Blacksmith, Bloodwork, Double Down, Fiddler, Folded Man, Girder, Papercut, Peek-a-Boo, Plunder, Rag Doll, Razer, Thinker, and Top. As the battle continues, Thawne reveals that he was responsible not only for the creation of Barry's other major speedster enemies, such as Zoom and Godspeed, but reveals that he was present at every moment where Barry essentially isolated himself from his allies, such as keeping the investigation into the button secret or provoking the fight between Barry and Wally, whispering at hyperspeed to implant a subconscious suggestion in their minds. The Flash family receives aid from different Flashes from across time and the Multiverse as well as the Renegades. As Barry forces Thawne into the Speed Force, Barry's allies are able to meditate to tap the Force's power and banish their foes back to their points of origin, but the Tornado Twins contact those in the present stating that this will be Barry and Thawne's final race. Confronted with Thawne's taunts about how their history with each other had defined them for so long, Barry instead chose to forgive Thawne rather than kill him or allow him to escape, tricking Thawne into attacking him as he was vibrating at just the right frequency to 'infect' Thawne with a sample of his own Speed Force energy. This transference 'grounded' Thawne back in reality, erasing his personal experience of his life as the Reverse Flash, leaving him as a tour guide in the Flash Museum of his home era and unaware of his villainous past.

Powers and abilities
Eobard Thawne already possessed genius-level intellect by the standards of the 25th Century even prior to gaining his metahuman abilities, making him possibly one of the smartest individuals when in the 21st century. The Flash: Rebirth revealed that duplicating the accident behind Barry Allen's powers corrupted the Speed Force which created a negative version. The Reverse-Flash is therefore able to travel at superhuman speeds faster than the speed of light, deliver blows of extreme force by hitting the victim hundreds of times a second, run on water, generate vacuums, create afterimages ("speed mirages") of himself, and vibrate his molecules to pass through solid objects. Unlike original Speed Force users, Thawne has the ability to travel through and manipulate time, being able to drastically alter history and completely erase people from existence (other speedsters cannot change the past without dramatic consequences). Thawne developed numerous new powers in the events leading up to Flashpoint, including the ability to cross over to other dimensions, create shock waves across time and space at the snap of his fingers, absorb another's memories via physical contact, and alter the age of anyone or anything. Thawne has also displayed superhuman strength, as well as electrokinetic abilities. The presence of his lightning is able to disrupt and fry nearby electronics, in addition to allowing him to manipulate magnetism. During the New 52 reboot, he gained the ability to slow down time similar to Hunter Zolomon. He retained his Pre-New 52 counterpart's age-altering abilities. In the DC Rebirth relaunch, however, Thawne regains his connection to the Negative Speed Force and therefore all of his original powers.

Other versions

Impulse
In an alternate timeline created when Impulse kills an insect in the Devonian Age, most super-villains are government bureaucrats. Professor Zoom is the National Science Advisor to President-for-Life Julian Tremain. In subsequent changes to the timeline, Zoom defected to the rebellion against Tremain led by Gorilla Grodd; turned into a gorilla fighting against an army of flying turtles led by Grodd, now a flying turtle himself; and was a gorilla in a modern society identical to that of ancient Egypt.

In other media

Television
 Eobard Thawne / Professor Zoom appears in the Batman: The Brave and the Bold episode "Requiem for a Scarlet Speedster!", voiced by John Wesley Shipp.
 Eobard Thawne / Reverse-Flash appears in The CW's Arrowverse, portrayed by Tom Cavanagh and Matt Letscher. While the character is introduced and featured most prominently in the television series The Flash, he has also appeared in the spin-off series Legends of Tomorrow as well as the crossover events "Crisis on Earth-X" and "Elseworlds".
 Eobard Thawne appears in Robot Chicken, voiced by Seth Green and Tom Cavanagh.
 Thawne also appears in Robot Chicken DC Comics Special 2: Villains in Paradise and Robot Chicken DC Comics Special III: Magical Friendship, voiced by Matthew Senreich in the former and with no dialogue in the latter. He appears as a member of the Legion of Doom in Villains in Paradise.
 Eobard Thawne / Reverse-Flash makes non-speaking cameo appearances in Harley Quinn. This version is a member of the Legion of Doom.

Film
 Eobard Thawne / Professor Zoom appears as a major antagonist in the films set in the DC Animated Movie Universe (DCAMU), voiced by C. Thomas Howell.
 First appearing in Justice League: The Flashpoint Paradox, he attempts to kill the Flash via the Rogues, but is thwarted by his nemesis and the Justice League. Despite this, Zoom taunts the Flash over the latter's mother's death before Superman takes the former to prison. After the Flash creates the "Flashpoint" timeline and fails to restore the original, Zoom returns to reveal that as long as he is alive, the Flash cannot draw enough energy from the Speed Force to travel through time again. However, Batman shoots Zoom, allowing Flash to undo the "Flashpoint" timeline.
 In Suicide Squad: Hell to Pay, immediately after Batman shot him, Zoom drew energy from the Speed Force to slow down the moment of his death and survive into the new timeline the Flash created. As this limited the use of his speed, Thawne recruits Silver Banshee, Blockbuster, and Killer Frost to help him acquire a "Get Out of Hell Free" card so he can cheat death, only to run afoul of the Suicide Squad. Though Zoom retrieves the card, Bronze Tiger slices the fingers holding it off before Deadshot permanently kills Zoom, sending him back to die in the "Flashpoint" timeline.
 Eobard Thawne / Reverse-Flash appears in Lego DC Comics Super Heroes: The Flash, voiced by Dwight Schultz.
 Eobard Thawne / Reverse-Flash makes a cameo appearance in Injustice.

Video games
 Eobard Thawne / Professor Zoom appears in DC Universe Online.
 The Arrowverse incarnation of Eobard Thawne, based on his Harrison Wells disguise, appears as a playable character in the mobile version of Injustice: Gods Among Us.
 Eobard Thawne / Professor Zoom appears in Scribblenauts Unmasked: A DC Comics Adventure.
 Eobard Thawne / Reverse-Flash appears as an unlockable playable character in Lego Batman 3: Beyond Gotham, voiced by Liam O'Brien.
 Eobard Thawne / Reverse-Flash appears as a "premier skin" for the Flash in Injustice 2, voiced again by Liam O'Brien. After being trapped in a paradox following the Regime killing one of his ancestors, this version is left stranded in the 21st century and joins Gorilla Grodd's Society to seek revenge on the Flash.
 Eobard Thawne / Reverse-Flash appears in Lego DC Super-Villains, voiced again by C. Thomas Howell. This version is a member of the Legion of Doom.

Miscellaneous
Eobard Thawne / Reverse Flash appears in Justice League Adventures #6 (June 2002).

Reception

IGN ranked Eobard Thawne as the 31st Greatest Comic Book Villain Of All Time in 2009 and #2 on their Top 5 Flash Villains list in 2015.

References

External links
 Professor Zoom at the DC Database
 Reverse-Flash at dccomics.com
 Professor Zoom at Those Who Ride the Lightning
 Professor Zoom at the DCU Guide 

Characters created by Carmine Infantino
Characters created by John Broome
Villains in animated television series
Comics characters introduced in 1963
DC Comics characters who can move at superhuman speeds
DC Comics characters with accelerated healing
DC Comics characters with superhuman senses
DC Comics characters with superhuman strength
DC Comics male supervillains
DC Comics metahumans
DC Comics scientists
DC Comics television characters
Fictional characters displaced in time
Fictional characters who can manipulate reality
Fictional characters who can manipulate time
Fictional characters who can turn intangible
Fictional characters who can manipulate sound
Fictional characters with air or wind abilities
Fictional characters with absorption or parasitic abilities
Fictional characters with dimensional travel abilities
Fictional characters with electric or magnetic abilities 
Fictional characters with density control abilities
Fictional characters with death or rebirth abilities
Fictional characters with spirit possession or body swapping abilities
Fictional characters with anti-magic or power negation abilities
Fictional mass murderers
Fictional physicists
Fictional serial killers
Time travelers
Video game bosses
Flash (comics) characters